BOC GATE is a locality in Bongaigaon city, surrounded by localities of Paglasthan, Dolaigaon and Chapaguri with nearest railway station, New Bongaigaon railway station at New Bongaigaon. This is one of busiest localities of the town. College, ITI and other private educational institutions are mostly located near the area.

Attractions
This area is the modern shopping centre of the town.  Departmental store, shopping malls and multiplex cinema is there in the area. Several good restaurants are also there.

See also
 Borpara, Bongaigaon
 Dhaligaon
 Mahabeersthan

References

Neighbourhoods in Bongaigaon